Marie of Lusignan (1273 – Tortosa, April 1319) was a daughter of Hugh III of Cyprus and his wife Isabella of Ibelin. She was Queen of Aragon by her marriage and was a member of the House of Poitiers-Lusignan.

Life

Marie was the fifth of thirteen children. Her siblings included John II of Jerusalem, Henry II of Jerusalem and Amalric, Prince of Tyre.

Marie remained unmarried for many years; she was recorded as having been present in her brother Amalric's court in 1310. She was however eventually betrothed to James II of Aragon in 1315, who had been married twice before and was father to ten legitimate children.

As Marie was heiress to Cyprus, James considered a matrimonial union with her to be politically advantageous. They married by proxy at Santa Sophia, Nicosia on 15 June 1315 and in person at Girona on 27 November 1315. Marie was already forty-two and the marriage was purely for reasons of state, so James could rule Cyprus on the death of Marie's brother Henry. They had no children.

The couple were only married for four years before Marie died in Tortosa in April 1319. As Marie did not outlive her brother, James' plans of ruling Cyprus had failed. After Marie's death James complained that she had been too old and had not proved companionable. Marie's brother Henry died five years later and was succeeded by their nephew Hugh. James remarried a final time to Elisenda de Montcada before his death in 1327.

References

1273 births
1319 deaths
House of Poitiers-Lusignan
Aragonese queen consorts
Sardinian queens consort
Countesses of Barcelona
Daughters of kings